Björn Westerblad (born 7 January 1985) is a Swedish retired footballer who played as a midfielder.

In May 2020, 35-year old Westerblad announced his retirement from football.

References

External links

1985 births
Living people
Association football midfielders
Swedish footballers
Allsvenskan players
Superettan players
Trelleborgs FF players
Helsingborgs IF players
Ängelholms FF players
Åtvidabergs FF players